Ganjegan or Ganjgan may refer to:
 Ganjgan, Fars
 Ganjegan, Isfahan
 Ganjegan-e Olya, Kohgiluyeh and Boyer-Ahmad Province
 Ganjegan-e Sofla, Kohgiluyeh and Boyer-Ahmad Province